Breizhops is a genus of trilobite in the order Phacopida, which existed in what is now Brittany, France. It was described by Morzadec in 1983, and the type species is Breizhops lanceolatus.

References

External links
 Breizhops at the Paleobiology Database

Fossils of France
Acastidae